Murder at the Cannes Film Festival is a 2000 television film directed by Harvey Frost, and written by Jeffrey Hatcher,  starring French Stewart, Jay Brazeau, Karina Lombard and Bo Derek.

Reception
Variety called it "a clever teleplay".

References

External links
 

2000 films
2000 television films
American comedy television films
Canadian comedy television films
English-language Canadian films
Films directed by Harvey Frost
2000s American films
2000s Canadian films